Achaea xanthodera is a species of moth of the family Erebidae first described by William Jacob Holland in 1894. It is found in the Democratic Republic of the Congo, Gabon and Nigeria.

References 

Achaea (moth)
Lepidoptera of West Africa
Insects of Gabon
Erebid moths of Africa
Moths described in 1894